Steven Thachuk is a classical and fingerstyle guitarist.  Born in Toronto, Ontario, Canada, he has been head of classical guitar studies at California State University Northridge, United States, since 2002.

Discography 
Evocacion (2002) - The Meyer-Thachuk Guitar Duo 
Currents (2004)

References

External links 
 
CSUN Music

Canadian guitarists
Living people
Year of birth missing (living people)